Burning Organ is an album released in 2002 by American rock musician Paul Gilbert, also a guitarist for the heavy metal band Racer X and (then) formerly of the hard rock band Mr. Big.

The song "Keep on Keepin' On" has a short hidden track called "Maseito", a tribute to a Japanese DJ.

Track listing

Personnel
 Paul Gilbert – vocals and guitars
 David Richardson – piano and organ
 Mike Szuter – bass guitar and backing vocals
 Marco Minnemann – drums
 Linus of Hollywood – keyboards and backing vocals

Production
 Mixing – Tom Size
 Engineer – Paul Gilbert and Linus of Hollywood

References

Paul Gilbert albums
2002 albums
Shrapnel Records albums